A Lot of Love is the fifteenth album by American singer Melba Moore. It was released by Capitol Records on July 18, 1986. This album featured two number-one R&B hits, including the duet, "A Little Bit More", with Freddie Jackson and "Falling". She scored other popular R&B hits including "Love the One I'm With (A Lot of Love)" and "It's Been So Long".

Reception
The Allmusic review by Bil Carpenter awarded the album 4.5 stars stating "Warm soul duets with Freddie Jackson and Kashif."

Track listing

Personnel 
Ron Banks – engineer
Beau Huggins – producer
Melba Moore – vocals

Charts

References 

1986 albums
Melba Moore albums
Capitol Records albums